Khvajehabad or Khajeh Abad may refer to:
 Khvajehabad, Kerman
 Khvajehabad, Khuzestan
 Khvajehabad, Razavi Khorasan